The Uruguayan savanna ecoregion used to be covered by grasslands, palm savannas, and gallery forests along the Uruguay, Negro, Yaguarí, Queguay, and Tacuarembó rivers. Unfortunately, agriculture and cattle ranching have heavily altered these natural communities. The savannas are critically endangered because there are few small isolated patches of intact habitat remaining. The whole ecoregion has been severely altered by cattle ranching, one of the main pillars of the national economy in Uruguay. About 80% of Uruguayan territory is used for cattle ranching on natural and artificial savannas.

Water pollution is another major issue, with around 30% of children in Uruguay having excessive levels of lead in their systems due to the tap water. Other heavy metals from untreated waste, and unregulated discharges from the petrochemical industry and thermoelectric power plant wash into the river systems and into the sea.  

On the positive side, Uruguay has committed to reducing its dependence on fossil fuels, especially in power production, with heavy investment in renewables. 

The main state agency in charge of the environment is the National Directorate for the Environment (DINAMA) which is part of the Ministry of Housing, Territorial Planning and Environment.

Current issues

Pollution of Drinking Water 

The Santa Lucia River, could be the body of water that provides over 60% of Uruguayans with their tap water, has experienced a significant decline in quality since 2014. Increased dumping from agricultural companies into the sanitary system raised the amount of toxic waste in the water, and the decrease in rain does not allow the dilution of this waste to occur. Excessive amounts of fertilizers, the dumping of cesspit waste and wastewater treatment plants working to only half of their capacity are also large factors in the pollution of this basin.

The excess of phosphorus in the water is too much to be consumed by phytoplankton (who keep the ecosystem balanced), therefore ends up ruining the water and helps develop cyanobacterias, that pollute drinking water. Most of the waste that is dumped into the basins helps to produce this excess of phosphorus.

A study has shown that those children who have water filters in their homes, get better grades in school, no matter their social-economic standing. 30% of children in Uruguay have excessive levels of lead in their systems, due to it being in their tap water. Other heavy metals are also washed into river systems and out into the sea

Lead exposure 
Most lead exposure in the country is concentrated in Montevideo where most lead-using industries are concentrated. For example, the Radesca S.A. battery factory in Montevideo was one of the worst historical sources of lead in the country, in part due to poor disposal practices.

In particular, the identification of lead exposure in the neighborhood of La Teja from industrial contamination, lead to the create of an environmental justice movement in the neighborhood, organized under the community group Comisión Vivir Sin Plomo (Commission to Live without Lead). Uruguayan-American academic Daniel Renfrew claimed that the community created the first environmental justice movement in the country.

Subsequent the La Teja episode, government commissions were established and subsequent public investment lead to both study and regulation of lead in most of the effected industries. A clinic was established at the Pereira Rossell Hospital in Montevideo, called The Health Clinic for Environmental Chemical Contaminants, that became a center for treating lead. The founding doctor, Elena Queirolo, would continue finding high concentrations of lead throughout the country.

Livestock and its effect on water 

Worldwide, Livestock production is one of the fastest growing agricultural industries. Uruguay has a long history with livestock productions, with 70-80% of the land being devoted to pastures, both natural and cultivated; and since 1960, the production has doubled. This puts an increased pressure on the grasslands, and with the soil quality decreasing, fertilizers need to be used to combat this void. But this has consequences; the increase in production can cause the crops to drain the local water supply, as it is required for irrigation and this makes it difficult for other plants to grow. In addition to this, large areas of forests have been cleared out to create new farmland, to grow food to feed the increasing number of cattle. Excess fertilizer use can cause eutrophication of the aquatic ecosystems, when the excess fertilizers are washed into streams or ponds, it leads explosive growth of algae, which in any stagnant waters may cause oxygen levels to drop and making the water uninhabitable to most of the organisms.

Deforestation 

Forestry is one of the largest growing industries in the country, which has affected the fertility of Uruguayan meadows. Over 10% of Uruguay's forest has been destroyed, yet with the Forestation law implemented in 1988 there have been some restrictions as to how the private sector is able to operate, by not allowing them to cut an excess of trees.

Uruguay had a 2018 Forest Landscape Integrity Index mean score of 3.61/10, ranking it 147th globally out of 172 countries.

Pulp Mills 
Botnia was established in Fray Bentos in 2006. It meets all of the environmental requisites proposed by the IFC and the MIGA. It was also shown how Botnia would in fact help the city of Fray Bentos’ sanitary system by putting their waste through Botnia’s filters. Botnia was sold to UPM in 2009, and they have now also taken the production of biomass energy into their products.

Afforestation 

 
Uruguay is a country consisting mostly of prairie land, with only 3.6% of it being high forest. Afforestation is when trees are planted to create new forest areas. But the main problem is the introduction of new non-indigenous species in the process, which, in some areas, are in competition with the local species. Large areas of the prairie land have been converted into forest, mainly for agro forestry, and large quantities of pesticides and herbicides are used to keep the trees from getting affected by pests and weeds, and when these trees are harvested, the land becomes bare, which creates a fire hazard. Afforestation has been further accelerated by the demand for wood by the pulp mills, adding the damage. The introduction of the new forests may also fragment the existing the native forests, thus affecting the genetic diversity through a process of allopatric separation.

Heavy Metal Pollution 

Heavy metal pollution in Uruguay can be illustrated by the pollution in Montevideo Harbour, a part of the Montevideo Bay, covering an area of around 12 km2, and a part of the Rìo de la Plata estuary. The bay has an average depth of 5 m and a micro tidal environment, with the wind controlling the hydrodynamics. Untreated waste from the municipalities upstream; as well as industrial discharges from the petrochemical industry, and thermoelectric power plant flow into the bay. It is also the recipient of the water of Pantanoso and Miguelete, two streams with excessive pollutants present in them. Unregulated discharge has led to high level of heavy metals (Cd, Zn, Cu, Cr, Pb, Ag and Hg) and hydrocarbons accumulating in the water, and these high levels can have horrible environmental effects, as well as causing harm to humans.

The heavy metals usually end up settling at the bottom with the sediment, or getting taken up by marine organisms. Although marine organisms require trace amount of the heavy metal ion for their normal body functioning, the excess amounts of the heavy metals found in the bay and the surrounding Rìo de la Plata estuary, resulted in the build-up of their concentration in the muscle, and liver tissues of the fish. The contamination then travels up the food chains, from one organism to another, thus affecting wide range of organisms, and greatly increasing the concentrations with each trophic level, in the process called biomagnification. Humans, by virtue of being high in the food chain, may find in their food, the concentration of the heavy metals, exceed their natural demand, by orders of magnitude resulting in the range of bio-toxic effects on the body.  Although some steps have been taken by the government of Uruguay, to assess the heavy metals in the aquatic environment; the effects of its impact on fish and many other members of marine biota have largely been ignored.

Climate change

Energy

Wind Energy 

22% of electric energy is produced by wind power. By 2017, they believe that number will grow to 38%, which would mean second in the world to only Denmark. In only 10 years, Uruguay has been able to develop its wind power helping the hydroelectric energy situation that has seen itself in constant decline due to the increasing droughts in the region. In 2005, Uruguay had no electricity generated by wind whatsoever, in 2015 its output was of over 580 megawatts, and it is predicted that the country will be generating over 2000 megawatts, becoming a world leader in wind energy.

Due to its very flat terrain, Uruguay has a very constant and stable wind power. Uruguayan wind energy generates from 40% to 50% of full capacity, that is if the turbines were constantly moving at full potential. On the other hand, American wind energy generates only 34% of its full capacity.

The entire wind energy project is set to cost 3 billion dollars.

Solar Energy 
Uruguay is aiming to develop solar energy in the near future. A private entity called Tecnova Renovables has a solar power plant that now provides the equivalent of the electrical consumption of 100 homes. The government is also developing plans for solar power. The fact that it is very unpredictable is the reason why the government remains suspect in investing large amounts of money in this energy source.

Hydro Energy 

Hydroelectric energy used to produce over half of the sustainable electrical energy for Uruguay. The largest dams are located on the Uruguay River, the biggest being the Salto Grande Dam.

Two more dams will be built in Uruguay, without the moving of any housing or population. Even though these two dams are being constructed, the country intends to move away from hydroelectric energy because of climate change. More and more droughts affect the region and becoming too dependent on these dams has forced Uruguay to purchase great amounts of fossil fuels from other countries to produce electricity.

Biomass Energy 
Uruguay possesses very developed foresting, cattle and agriculture industries. From being practically nonexistent in 2004, only generating 1% of the electric energy of the South American country, it reached an all time high in 2014, achieving 13%. The two main agencies that create this energy source are UPM and Montes del Plata, two pulp mills that are taking great awareness in taking care of the environment.

Agencies
The main state agency in charge of the environment is the National Directorate for the Environment (DINAMA) which is part of the Ministry of Housing, Territorial Planning and Environment.

Green parties
Green politics did not set roots in Uruguay for a long time. In the 1989 election the Green Eto-Ecologist Party obtained 0.5% of the popular vote; in general, environmental organizations have had low political significance, often as part of other bigger parties.

In the 2014 election a new political group is taking part, the Ecologist Radical Intransigent Party. Led by Cesar Vega, they preach on the preservation of natural resources and are against open-pit mining.

See also
Uruguay River pulp mill dispute

References

Environment of Uruguay
Uruguay